The Oppenheimer Award (also known as the Newsday George Oppenheimer Award or the Oppy) was named after the late playwright and Newsday drama critic George Oppenheimer. It was awarded annually to the best New York debut production by an American playwright for a non-musical play. The selection committee has included playwrights Edward Albee, Wendy Wasserstein, James Lapine, and Richard Greenberg. The award carries a $5,000 cash prize. The first award of $1,000, to the play Getting Out by Marsha Norman, was made in 1979, two years after Oppenheimer's death. It was discontinued in 2007.

Winners
1979 Getting Out, Marsha Norman
1981 Crimes of the Heart'’, Beth Henley
1983 To Gillian on Her 37th Birthday,  Michael Brady
1985 The Bloodletters by Richard Greenberg
1988 Mr. Universe by Jim Grimsley
1989 The Film Society Jon Robin Baitz
1990 Tales of the Lost Formicans,  Constance Congdon
1991 La Bête by David Hirson
1992 Marvin's Room, Scott McPherson
1993 Joined at the Head by Catherine Butterfield
1994 Pterodactyls by Nicky Silver. Why We Have a Body by Claire Chafee
1996 Insurrection: Holding History, Robert O'Hara
1997 "The Grey Zone", Tim Blake Nelson
1999 Wit by Margaret Edson
2002 Brutal Imagination by Cornelius Eady
2003 Corner Wars by Tim Dowlin
2004 The Flu Season by Will Eno
2005 Everything Will Be Different: A Brief History of Helen of Troy, Mark Schultz
2006 The Sugar Bean Sisters, Nathan Sanders
2007 Heddatron'', Elizabeth Meriwether

Notes

American theater awards